The Office of Biorepositories and Biospecimen Research is a division of the United States National Cancer Institute which was formed in 2005 to promote and develop biobank infrastructure.

History
The guidelines which the OBBR published were among the first generation of policies relating to biobank ethics.

Biospecimen Research Network Symposia
The OBBR organizes an annual conference called the "Biospecimen Research Network Symposia".

References

External links

Biobank organizations